Jarqavieh Olya Rural District is a rural district (dehestan) in Jarqavieh Olya District, Isfahan County, Isfahan Province, Iran. At the 2006 census, its population was 5,026, in 1,438 families.  The rural district has 5 villages.

References 

Rural Districts of Isfahan Province
Isfahan County